Cuyocuyo District is one of ten districts of the province Sandia in Peru.

Geography 
The Apolobamba mountain range traverses the district. Other mountains are listed below:

Ethnic groups 
The people in the district are mainly indigenous citizens of Quechua descent. Quechua is the language which the majority of the population (79.81%) learnt to speak in childhood, 19.79% of the residents started speaking using the Spanish language (2007 Peru Census).

See also 
 Sayt'uqucha

References